The Black Procession is the first EP by American heavy metal band Machine Head, released on April 16, 2011. The record is a limited 10" vinyl that features three previously unreleased live tracks that were recorded during 2010's Black Procession Tour in support of the band's last studio effort, The Blackening. The record was released to celebrate Record Store Day.

Track listing

References

Machine Head (band) albums
2011 EPs
Roadrunner Records EPs
Record Store Day releases